Todireşti may refer to several places:

 Todirești, Iași, a commune in Iaşi County, Romania
 Todirești, Suceava, a commune in Suceava County, Romania
 Todirești, Vaslui, a commune in Vaslui County, Romania
 Todireşti, Ungheni, a commune in Ungheni district, Moldova
 Todireşti, a village in Chetrosu, Anenii Noi Commune, Anenii Noi district, Moldova